How Far Shallow Takes You  is the second full-length studio album by Canadian punk rock band Gob, and was released on November 24, 1998, on Fearless Records.  The album was re-released on December 8, 1998, on Landspeed Records due to a conflict between the band and Fearless Records. The album was again re-released by Nettwerk Management; both this version and the Landspeed version featured a 17th track, "All We Are".  The American release also featured a cover of "Paint It, Black" by the Rolling Stones, and an alternate recording of "What to Do".  "What to Do" and "Beauville" were released as singles. What to Do was featured in the 2000 DCOM film Mom's Got a Date with a Vampire. It is the first album to feature bassist Craig Wood and drummer Gabe Mantle. The album was described by AllMusic as containing "generally well-executed melodic punk rock in the style common in the 1990s." By December 1999, the album had sold 20,000 copies in Canada.

Track listing
 "236 E. Broadway" - 1:21 (Tom)
 "On These Days..." - 2:24 (Tom)
 "Self-Appointed Leader" - 3:12 (Theo)
 "Beauville" - 1:42 (Tom)
 "What to Do" - 2:22  (Theo)
 "The Mend" - 1:38  (Tom)
 "Reign On Your Parade" - 2:24 (Theo) 
 "Suds" - 2:25 (Tom)
 "Nothing New" - 3:11 (Tom)
 "Burying Your Past" - 1:39 (Tom)  
 "Naked" - 2:21 (Tom) 
 "License from a Cereal Box" - 2:03 (Theo)
 "Stand and Deliver" - 1:33 (Theo)
 "Ok" - 2:08 (Tom) 
 "Together" - 1:59 (Theo)
 "Things Happen All the Time" - 1:19 (Theo)
 "All We Are" (Uncredited bonus track on some re-releases) - 2:02 (Theo)
 "Paint It, Black" (The Rolling Stones cover) (US edition bonus track) - 3:17 (Tom)

All tracks written by Tom and Theo/Gob except lyrics for "Together" (Happy Kreter), lyrics for "Self-Appointed Leader" (Theo/Happy Kreter), and the bonus track on the US edition, "Paint It, Black" (Mick Jagger/Keith Richards).

Personnel
 Theo - Lead and Backing Vocals, Lead and Rhythm Guitar
 Tom - Lead and Backing Vocals, Lead and Rhythm Guitar
 Craig - Bass, Backing Vocals
 Gabe - Drums, Backing Vocals
 The Greek - backing vocals
 The Hick - backing vocals
 The Shrimp - backing vocals
 The Kid - backing vocals
 Howdy Doody - backing vocals
 Blair Calibaba - Recording, producer, mixing
 Tom Lord-Alge - Mixing ("What To Do")
 Zach Blackstone - 2nd engineer
 Eddy Schreyer - Mastering

References

1998 albums
Gob (band) albums
Fearless Records albums
Nettwerk Records albums